Paul de Senneville (born 30 July 1933) is a French composer and a music producer.

Career

He began his career as a journalist working for French newspapers such as France Soir. Later, he became a TV program producer as well. 

In 1988 he created Delphine Software International, a video game development company.

Music career

As a director of a record company, Delphine Records, he started a new career on the basis of his passion in life: music.

After writing his first song in 1962, he contributed music for songs in many movie soundtracks produced by French companies such as Universe Galaxie and Daber Films. In 1968, while managing Michel Polnareff's career, he met Olivier Toussaint, with the two later forming a successful songwriting partnership. Their songs were recorded by major French artists such as: Mireille Mathieu, Michèle Torr, Christophe, Hervé Vilard, Dalida, Petula Clark and Claude François. This partnership accounts for over 100 million records sold internationally. Partnering with lyricist Jean-Loup Dabadie, he wrote Tous les bateaux, tous les oiseaux, a French hit recorded by Michel Polnareff.

Very soon, the pair got involved in production. They started the group Pop Concerto Orchestra, on which Toussaint sang lead. Soon after, they launched their second group Anarchic System that produced Rock & roll. Over a period of 5 years, the two groups sold millions of records.

His compositions
 Dolannes Mélodie (1975)
 Ballade pour Adeline (1977)
 A comme amour (1978)
 Les jardins de Monaco (with Olivier Toussaint)(1978)
 Mariage d'amour (1978)
 Lettre à ma mère (1979)
 Souvenir d'enfance (1985)
 Eléana (1987)
 Sagittaire (1988)
 Song of Ocarina (1991)
 Comme ils sont loin les souvenirs (1994)
 Hungarian Sonata (1997)
 Chinese Garden (1998)
 Princesse du désert (1999)
 J 'aime les gens qui s'aiment (2001)
 Pour tout l'amour du monde (2004)
 Tous Les Bateaux, Tous Les Oiseaux

Compositions for movies
 1974 Convoy of Women 
 1974 Par ici la monnaie
 1974 Celestine, Maid at Your Service
 1974 No Pockets in a Shroud
 1974 French Romance
 1975 Tamara ou Comment j'ai enterré ma vie de jeune fille
 1975 Dangerous Passions
 1975 Comment se divertir quand on est cocu mais intelligent
 1975 Peeping Tom in the Lime Light
 1975 L'arrière-train sifflera trois fois
 1976 French Erection 
 1977 French Deep Throat
 1977 Des collégiennes très... spéciales
 1977 Un amour de sable
 1978 And Long Live Liberty
 1978 Les putes infernales 
 1979 A Very Special Woman
 1979 La nuit de l'été
 1983 Baby Cat
 1984 Irreconcilable Differences

Dolannes Mélodie
The success of "Dolannes Mélodie" launched the career of trumpet player Jean-Claude Borelly. The song reached #1 on the charts of France, Switzerland, Belgium and then in Germany, Austria, and the Netherlands. It reached first place in South America and later in Japan.

In 1978, Paul was represented by both France and Monaco in the Eurovision Song Contest 1978 by his composition, Les jardins de Monaco as a duet. In 1976, he and Olivier were nominated for the prestigious award César Award for Best Original Music (César is the French equivalent of the Oscar) for their movie scores in the film "Un linceul n'a pas de poches". He was bestowed the title of Comte — a title of French nobility.

Delphine Records
In the early 1970s, Paul and Olivier set up their own record label, Delphine Records named after Paul's first daughter, Delphine Deschodt. Delphine is a leading French music exporter and specialist in instrumental music.

Besides Jean-Claude Borelly, they discovered French instrumentalists such as Richard Clayderman (1976), Nicolas de Angelis (1981) and Diego Modena (1991).

De Senneville and Toussaint collaborated with famous French arrangers such as: Gérard Salesses, Hervé Roy, Bruno Ribera, and Marc Minier. Their main music productions was devoted to Clayderman's music.

"Ballade pour Adeline", "A Comme Amour" and "Lettre à ma Mère" are the biggest hits in Clayderman's recordings. These melodies were originally composed by de Senneville. He has composed around 400 melodies for Clayderman. Toussaint and Jean Baudlot are his composition partners.

Delphine group represents 15 companies as an advertising film and clip production company, an agency for advertising and casting actors and a casting agency as well as two modelling agencies. They have 4 recording studios in their "hotel particulier".

Personal life

Paul de Senneville enjoys classical music. Giuseppe Verdi is one of his favorites. He collects modern paintings and antique objects. He owns a horse statue made by Salvador Dalí.

He was the owner of racehorse L'Amiral Mauzun working with Jean-Philippe Ducher. The horse won the Elitloppet in 2007 among other races.

Paul de Senneville can allegedly neither read, write, nor play music. He sings into a small tape recorder at home or in his studio. Then he calls a pianist (or an arranger) to help him make an arrangement, before recording it with a larger ensemble.

External links
 Paul de Senneville atIMDB 
 Paul de Senneville in The Delphine Team
 Balladen om L'Amiral Mauzun (Original Swedish Text)
 of L'Amiral Mauzun (Google Translation from the original Swedish article)

1933 births
French male composers
French songwriters
Male songwriters
French record producers
Musicians from Paris
Living people